Akbarabad-e Barkhvordar (also Romanized as Akbarābād-e Barkhvordār and Akbarābād-e Barkhowrdār; also known as Akbarābād-e Pā’īn) is a village in Azadegan Rural District, in the Central District of Rafsanjan County, Kerman Province, Iran. At the 2006 census, its population was 299, in 76 families.

References 

Populated places in Rafsanjan County